2012 in Bellator MMA was the sixth installment of the Bellator Fighting Championships, which began on March 9, 2012. The sixth season of Bellator was originally scheduled to begin on March 2, 2012.  However, the debut was pushed back a week so it began with the show on March 9, 2012.

Mixed martial arts tournaments were held in five weight classes, including the bantamweight, featherweight, lightweight, welterweight and middleweight divisions.

Bellator 60

Bellator 60 took place on March 9, 2012 at The Venue at Horseshoe Casino in Hammond, Indiana. The event was distributed live in prime time by MTV2.

Background

Bellator 60 was expected to take place on March 2, but the season opener was pushed back one week.

Wagnney Fabiano was originally scheduled to face Ronnie Mann in the opening round of the Featherweight tournament; however, on March 1, 2012, Fabiano pulled out of the bout and was replaced by Mike Corey.

Genair da Silva was originally scheduled to face Alexandre Bezerra in the opening round of the Featherweight tournament; however, after weigh-in issues, da Silva was forced to pull out of the bout. He was replaced by Kenny Foster who was set to fight Bobby Reardanz on the undercard of this event.

Results

Bellator 61 

Bellator 61 took place on March 16, 2012 at Horseshoe Riverdome in Bossier City, Louisiana. The event was distributed live in prime time by MTV2.

Background

The event was to feature the rematch between season-five heavyweight tournament finalists Eric Prindle and Thiago Santos. Prindle and Santos met in the finals of Bellator's season-five heavyweight tourney, but the bout was ruled a no-contest when Santos inexplicably kicked a downed Prindle in the groin.  However, on March 15, Bellator announced the fight had been pushed back a week to Bellator 62 due to Prindle having "flu-like symptoms."

This event marked the first time that Bellator Fighting Championships aired in Brazil on TV Esporte Interativo.

Results

Bellator 62

Bellator 62 took place on March 23, 2012 at Laredo Energy Arena in Laredo, Texas. The event was distributed live in prime time by MTV2.

Background

The event hosted the opening round of Bellator's Season Six Lightweight Tournament.

Eric Prindle and Thiago Santos were supposed to have their rematch of the Season Five Heavyweight Tournament Final on this card, after having been delayed a week from Bellator 61.  Santos, however, failed to make weight and the bout was cancelled, and Prindle was awarded the tournament win by default. A scheduled fight between Cosmo Alexandre and Oscar de la Parra was also scrapped.

Results

Bellator 63

Bellator 63 took place on March 30, 2012 at Mohegan Sun Arena in Uncasville, Connecticut. The event was distributed live in prime time by MTV2.

Background

The event hosted the opening round of Bellator's Season Six Welterweight Tournament.

War Machine was expected to fight Karl Amoussou in the opening round of the welterweight tournament. However, War Machine was sentenced to a year in prison and was forced out of the bout and the tournament.

Brian Foster was scheduled to face David Rickels in the opening round of the welterweight tournament, but was not medically cleared for the event. Stepping in to fight Rickels was newcomer Jordan Smith.

Results

Bellator 64

Bellator 64 took place on April 6, 2012 at Caesar's Windsor in Windsor, Ontario. The event was distributed live in prime time by MTV2.

Background

The event hosted two of the opening round bouts of Bellator's Season Six Bantamweight Tournament.

Results

Bellator 65

Bellator 65 took place on April 13, 2012 at Boardwalk Hall in Atlantic City, New Jersey. The event was distributed live in prime time by MTV2.

Background

Heavyweight champion Cole Konrad was originally slated to defend his title against Eric Prindle at this event.  The fight, however, was moved to Bellator 70.

Results

Bellator 66

Bellator 66 took place on April 20, 2012 at I-X Center in Cleveland, Ohio. The event was distributed live in prime time by MTV2.

Background

NAAFS women's champion Aisling Daly was originally scheduled to face Jessica Eye on this card. Daly withdrew from the bout due to an ear infection and was replaced by Anita Rodriguez.

Bruno Santos was originally scheduled to face Brian Rogers in a Middleweight tournament semifinal bout; however, on April 16, 2012, it was revealed that Santos had to withdraw due to a shoulder injury and was replaced by Bellator newcomer Andreas Spang.

Tyler Combs and Jason Dent were originally announced to face each other in a lightweight bout.  Nevertheless, the fight did not materialize.

Results

Bellator 67

Bellator 67 took place on May 4, 2012 at Casino Rama in Rama, Ontario, Canada. The event was distributed live in prime time by MTV2.

Background

Bellator Lightweight champion, Michael Chandler, competed in a non-title "Super Fight" against PRIDE, UFC, and DREAM veteran, Akihiro Gono, at this event.

Results

Bellator 68

Bellator 68 took place on May 11, 2012 at Caesars Hotel and Casino in Atlantic City, New Jersey. The event was distributed live in prime time by MTV2.

Background

Kurt Pellegrino was scheduled to fight Marcin Held at this event. However, on March 13, Pellegrino suffered a knee injury and was forced to pull out of the bout. Phillipe Nover had stepped in as Pellegrino's replacement, but was eventually replaced by Bellator newcomer Derrick Kennington.

Eddie Fyvie and Jeff Lentz were originally scheduled to compete in a featherweight bout; however, the fight did not materialize.

Marius Žaromskis versus Waachiim Spiritwolf was originally going to be contested at welterweight; however, Spiritwolf failed to make the 171 pounds cut off allowance and the fight was changed to a catchweight bout at 172 pounds.

A catchweight bout at 230 pounds between Carmelo Marrero and Seth Petruzelli was cancelled the day of the show due to an illness by Petruzelli.

Results

Bellator 69

Bellator 69 took place on May 18, 2012 at the L'Auberge du Lac Casino Resort in Lake Charles, Louisiana. The event was distributed live in prime time by MTV2.

Background

This event held the finals of the Season Six Middleweight tournament.

Heavyweights Ron Sparks and Kevin Asplund were to compete in a tournament eliminator bout for a spot in the Bellator Season Seven Heavyweight tournament.  However, the bout was cancelled the day of the show due to Sparks feeling ill.

With Hector Lombard leaving for the Ultimate Fighting Championship, the Middleweight title was vacated.  On April 25, 2012, Bellator CEO Bjorn Rebney announced that the winner of the Middleweight tournament finale between Maiquel Falcão and Andreas Spang will face Alexander Shlemenko to crown the company's new Middleweight champion.

Results

Bellator 70

Bellator 70 took place on May 25, 2012 at the Orleans Convention Center in New Orleans, Louisiana. The event was distributed live in prime time by MTV2.

Background

Heavyweight champion Cole Konrad was originally slated to defend his title against Eric Prindle at Bellator 65.  Prindle, however, was injured and the fight was moved to this card, Bellator 70.

Fight card

Tournaments

Middleweight tournament bracket

Welterweight tournament bracket

Lightweight tournament bracket

Featherweight tournament bracket

Bantamweight tournament bracket

Bellator 71

Bellator 71 was a mixed martial arts event held by Bellator Fighting Championships. The event took place on June 22, 2012 at the Mountaineer Casino, Racetrack and Resort in Chester, West Virginia.  The event was distributed live in prime time by EPIX and online at SpikeTV.com.

Background

A preliminary bout between E. J. Brooks and Joey Holt was originally announced by the promotion.  However, the bout failed to materialize.

Richard Hale was supposed to face Beau Tribolet in the Tournament Quarterfinal, but was not cleared to compete so Tim Carpenter (who originally was supposed to face John Hawk) stepped in as a last minute replacement.

Results

Bellator 72

Bellator 72 was a mixed martial arts event held by Bellator Fighting Championships. The event took place on July 20, 2012 at USF Sun Dome in Tampa, Florida.   The event was distributed live in prime time by EPIX and MTV2.

Background

Paul Daley made his promotional debut at this event against Rudy Bears in a welterweight fight.

Marius Žaromskis and Waachiim Spiritwolf competed in a rematch - their third fight together - following a controversial doctor stoppage in their previous Bellator fight in May 2012.

A heavyweight bout between Chris Barnett and Tom Sauer was initially announced by the promotion for this card.  However, the bout failed to materialize.

Results

Bellator 73

Bellator 73 was a mixed martial arts event held by Bellator Fighting Championships. The event took place on August 24, 2012 at Harrah's Tunica Hotel and Casino in Tunica, Mississippi.  The event was distributed live in prime time by MTV2.

Background

This fight card was to feature Pat Curran making the first defense of his Featherweight title against Bellator season 4 Featherweight tournament winner Patricio Freire.  However, on August 14, 2012, it was announced that Curran had suffered an injury and the bout was to be rescheduled for a later date.

The card featured the finals of the season 6 Bantamweight tournament and 2012 Summer Series  Light Heavyweight tournament.

Marcus "Lelo" Aurelio was originally supposed to make his promotional debut on this card, but was removed due to an injury.  His original opponent, Amaechi Oselukwue, instead met replacement Kelvin Tiller.  Additionally, a heavyweight bout between Maurice Jackson and Chris Miller was announced, but failed to materialize.

Results

Light Heavyweight tournament bracket

Bellator 74

 The event was distributed live in prime time by MTV2.  It was the season debut of season seven.

Background

Bellator 74 hosted the opening round in the Bellator Season Seven Welterweight Tournament.

Alexandre Bezerra was originally scheduled to face The Ultimate Fighter: Live alumni Jeff Smith. However, Smith failed his pre-fight medical and was replaced by Matt McCook in a 157 lb catchweight fight. Plinio Cruz and Kelvin Tiller were also originally announced to meet in a middleweight fight, but the bout was cancelled after Cruz sustained an injury in training.

Results

Bellator 75

 The event was distributed live in prime time by MTV2.

Background

The event featured the long-planned rematch between season-five heavyweight tournament finalists Eric Prindle and Thiago Santos. Prindle and Santos met in the finals of Bellator's season-five heavyweight tourney, but the bout was ruled a no-contest when Santos inexplicably kicked a downed Prindle in the groin.  The initial rematch was scheduled for Bellator 61.  However, on March 15, Bellator announced the fight had been pushed back a week to Bellator 62 due to Prindle having "flu-like symptoms."  The following week Santos failed to make weight and the bout was cancelled, and Prindle was awarded the tournament win by default.  Incredibly, the fourth scheduled meeting of these two fighters again ended in controversy as this time Prindle accidentally kicked Santos in the groin in round one.

Results

Bellator 76

Bellator 76 took place on October 12, 2012 at Caesars Windsor in Windsor, Ontario, Canada. The event was distributed live in prime time by MTV2.

Background

Bellator 76 hosted the opening round in the Bellator Season Seven Featherweight Tournament.

Fight card

Bellator 77

Bellator 77 took place on October 19, 2012 at the Reading Eagle Theater in the Sovereign Center in Reading, Pennsylvania. The event was distributed live in prime time by MTV2.

Background

Bellator 77 hosted the opening round in the Bellator Season Seven Lightweight Tournament.

Results

Bellator 78

Bellator 78 took place on October 26, 2012 at the Nutter Center in Dayton, Ohio. The event was distributed live in prime time by MTV2.

Background

Bellator 78 hosted the semi-finals of Bellator's Season Seven Welterweight Tournament.

Results

Bellator 79

Bellator 79 took place on November 2, 2012 at Casino Rama in Rama, Ontario. The event was distributed live in prime time by MTV2.

Background

Bellator 79 hosted the one half of the semi-finals of Bellator's Season Seven Heavyweight Tournament and Featherweight Tournament.

Paul Daley was originally scheduled for this event, but was taken off the card due to concerns that he would be stopped at Canada border entry due to incomplete paperwork needed to secure a visa.

Results

Bellator 80

Bellator 80 took place on November 9, 2012 at the Seminole Hard Rock Hotel & Casino in Hollywood, Florida. The event was distributed live in prime time by MTV2.

Background

Bellator 80 hosted the second half of the semi-finals of Bellator's Season Seven Heavyweight Tournament and Featherweight Tournament.

The featherweight bout between Sky Moiseichik and Shanon Slack was changed to a 150 lb catchweight bout after both fighters failed to make weight.

Results

Bellator 81

Bellator 81 took place on November 16, 2012 at the Ryan Center in Kingston, Rhode Island. The event was distributed live in prime time by MTV2.

Background

Bellator 81 hosted the semi-finals of Bellator's Season Seven Lightweight Tournament.

Results

Bellator 82

Bellator 82 took place on November 30, 2012 at the Soaring Eagle Casino & Resort in Mt. Pleasant, Michigan. The event was distributed live in prime time by MTV2.

Background

Bellator 82 hosted the final of Bellator's Season Seven Welterweight Tournament.

British fighter Michael Page was expected to make his Bellator debut at this event, but withdrew due to undergoing jaw surgery.

Results

Bellator 83

Bellator 83 took place on December 7, 2012 at the Caesars Atlantic City in Atlantic City, New Jersey The event was distributed live in prime time by MTV2.

Background

Bellator 83 was expected to host the final of Bellator's Season Seven Featherweight Tournament between finalists Shahbulat Shamhalaev and Rad Martinez.  However, the night of the show it was announced on the air that the bout was cancelled due to Shamhalaev having food poisoning.  The fight was initially moved to the following week's show, but then later postponed to season eight.

Results

Bellator 84

Bellator 84 took place on December 14, 2012 at the Horseshoe Casino in Hammond, Indiana. The event was distributed live in prime time by MTV2.

Background

Bellator 84 hosted the final of Bellator's Season Seven Heavyweight and Lightweight Tournaments.

Christian M'Pumbu was expected to make his first defense of his light heavyweight title against 2012 Summer Series tournament winner Attila Vegh.  However, on December 3, 2012, it was announced that Vegh had been pulled from the card due to injury and the match postponed for a later date.

Marcin Held and Dave Jansen were scheduled to compete in the Lightweight Tournament Final on this card.  However, the match was cancelled because the Indiana Gaming Commission barred the 20-year-old Held from competing as one must be 21 to enter a casino.

The fight between Richard Hale and Alexander Volkov was the Heavyweight Tournament Final as well as for the vacated Heavyweight Title.

Results

Tournaments

Heavyweight tournament bracket

Welterweight tournament bracket

Lightweight tournament bracket

Featherweight tournament bracket

References

External links
Bellator

2012 American television seasons
2012 in mixed martial arts
Bellator MMA events